Happiness is an emotional state characterized by feelings of enjoyment, pleasure, and satisfaction.

Happiness may also refer to:

Film
 Happiness (1917 film), an American silent film directed by Reginald Barker
 Happiness (1924 film), an American silent film directed by King Vidor
 Le Bonheur (1934 film) or Happiness, a French film directed by Marcel L'Herbier
 Happiness (1935 film), a Soviet silent film directed by Aleksandr Medvedkin
 Happiness (1957 film), a Mexican film directed by Alfonso Corona Blake
 Happiness (1965 film) or Le Bonheur, a French film directed by Agnès Varda
 Happiness (1998 film), an American film directed by Todd Solondz
 Happiness (2007 film), a South Korean film directed by Hur Jin-ho
 Happiness (2014 film), a French-Finnish documentary by Thomas Balmès
 Happiness (2016 film), a Hong Kong film directed by Andy Lo

Literature
 Happiness (manga), a manga series by Shūzō Oshimi
 Happiness (play), a 2013 play by David Williamson
 "Happiness" (short story), an 1887 story by Anton Chekhov
 Happiness, a 2006 novel by Novala Takemoto
 Happiness, a 2006 book by Matthieu Ricard
 Happiness, reissue title of Generica, a 2001 novel by Will Ferguson
 Happiness: A History, a 2006 non-fiction book by Darrin M. McMahon
 "Happiness", a poem by A. A. Milne from his 1924 book When We Were Very Young

Music

Groups
 Happiness (group), a Japanese pop girl group

Albums
 Happiness (The Beloved album), 1990
 Happiness (Dance Gavin Dance album) or the title song, 2009
 Happiness (Fridge album), 2001
 Happiness (Hurts album) or the title song, 2010
 Happiness (Kid606 album), 2013
 Happiness (Lisa Germano album) or the title song, 1993
 Happiness (Maki Ohguro album) or the title song, 2005
 Happiness (Matthew Ryan album), 2002
 Happiness (Margo Smith album), 1977
 Happiness? (Roger Taylor album) or the title song, 1994
 Happiness (The Weepies album) or the title song, 2003
 Happiness (Kōfuku Kangei!) or the title song, by Berryz Kobo, 2004
 Happiness (EP) or the title song, by Tom Hingley, 2002
 Happiness: The Best of Michael Rose or the 1997 title song (see below), by Michael Rose, 2004
 Happiness... Is Not a Fish That You Can Catch, by Our Lady Peace, 1999
 Happiness, by The Russian Jazz Quartet, 1965

Songs
 "Happiness" (The 1975 song), 2022
 "Happiness" (Ai song), 2011
 "Happiness" (Alexis Jordan song), 2010
 "Happiness" (Arashi song), 2007
 "Happiness" (Bill Anderson song), 1963; covered by Ken Dodd, 1964
 "Happiness" (The Blue Nile song), 1996
 "Happiness" (Elliott Smith song), 2000
 "Happiness" (Goldfrapp song), 2008
 "Happiness!!!" (Kaela Kimura song), 2004
 "Happiness" (Pizzaman song), 1995
 "Happiness" (Pointer Sisters song), 1979
 "Happiness" (Red Velvet song), 2014
 "Happiness" (Robert Palmer song), 1991
 "Happiness" (Sam Sparro song), 2012
 "Happiness" (Vanessa Williams song), 1997
 "Happiness (Rotting My Brain)", by Regurgitator, 1999
 "Happiness", by Benjamin Ingrosso from Identification, 2018
 "Happiness", by Black Uhuru from Sinsemilla, 1980
 "Happiness", by Built to Spill from Ancient Melodies of the Future, 2001
 "Happiness", by Collective Soul from Blender, 2000
 "Happiness", by Eytan Mirsky from the film Happiness, 1998
 "Happiness", by the Fray from The Fray, 2009
 "Happiness", by iamnot from Hope, 2017
 "Happiness", by Kasabian from West Ryder Pauper Lunatic Asylum, 2009
 "Happiness", by Lee Ann Womack from There's More Where That Came From, 2005
 "Happiness", by Little Mix from Confetti, 2020
 "Happiness", by the Mavis's from Rapture, 2003
 "Happiness", by Michael Rose from Dance Wicked, 1997
 "Happiness", by Natalie Bassingthwaighte, a B-side of the single "1000 Stars", 2009
 "Happiness", by Needtobreathe from Hard Love, 2016
 "Happiness", by Orson from Bright Idea, 2006
 "Happiness", by Pet Shop Boys from Super, 2016
 "Happiness", by Platinum Weird from Make Believe, 2006
 "Happiness", by Susumu Hirasawa from Paranoia Agent Original Soundtrack, 2004
 "Happiness", by Taylor Swift from Evermore, 2020
 "Happiness", by Three Days Grace from Transit of Venus, 2012
 "Happiness", by Wilco from Schmilco, 2016
 "Happiness", by Will Young from Keep On, 2005
 "Happiness", from the musical Passion, 1994
 "Happiness", from the musical You're a Good Man, Charlie Brown, 1967
 "Prelude: Happiness", by Deep Purple from Shades of Deep Purple, 1968

Other uses
 Happiness (British TV series), a 2000s British sitcom
 Happiness! (visual novel), a Japanese video game and anime
 Happiness (South Korean TV series), a 2021 television series

See also
 Happy (disambiguation)
 Le bonheur (disambiguation)
 My Happiness (disambiguation)
 Utility, in economics, a concept sometimes correlated with happiness